Orlaya grandiflora, the white laceflower, is a species of flowering plant in the family Apiaceae, native to Mediterranean Europe. The uneven size of the individual florets gives it the appearance of lace, especially when planted in large swathes.

It is a recipient of the Royal Horticultural Society's Award of Garden Merit. It prefers a sunny, well-drained position.

References

Apioideae
Flora of Europe